Pottinger was one of the nine district electoral areas (DEA) in Belfast, Northern Ireland from 1985 to 2014. Located in the east of the city, the district elected six members to Belfast City Council and contained the wards of Ballymacarrett, Bloomfield, Orangefield, Ravenhill, The Mount, and Woodstock.

The wards of Ravenhill and Woodstock were part of the Belfast South constituencies for the Northern Ireland Assembly and UK Parliament, while the other four were part of the Belfast East Assembly and Parliamentary constituencies.

The district was bounded to the west by the River Lagan and the Ormeau Road, to the north by the Newtownards Road, to the east by Greenville Park and North Road and the Borough of Castlereagh to the south.

At the 2001 census the district had a Protestant majority, however there was also a large Catholic minority, particularly in areas such as the Short Strand, which is separated from the mainly unionist Cluan Place by one of the many peace lines in the district.

History
The DEA was created for the 1985 local elections, when it largely replaced the former electoral Area A. Five of the six wards came from Area A with the Bloomfield ward added from Area B. It was abolished for the 2014 local elections, when all of its wards except Orangefield formed part of a new Titanic district electoral area. The Orangefield ward became part of a new Lisnasharragh district electoral area.

Amenities

Amenities in the Pottinger district electoral area include:
 Ormeau Golf Club
 Ormeau Park
 Ravenhill Stadium, home of the Ulster Rugby team

Wards

Councillors

2011 elections

See also
Belfast City Council
Electoral wards of Belfast
Local government in Northern Ireland
Members of Belfast City Council
 Belfast Pottinger (UK Parliament constituency)
 Belfast Pottinger (Northern Ireland Parliament constituency)
 Belfast Willowfield (Northern Ireland Parliament constituency)
 2011 Northern Ireland local elections#Belfast
 2005 Northern Ireland local elections#Belfast
 2001 Northern Ireland local elections#Belfast
 1997 Northern Ireland local elections#Belfast
 1993 Northern Ireland local elections#Belfast
 1989 Northern Ireland local elections#Belfast
 1985 Northern Ireland local elections#Belfast

References

Former District Electoral Areas of Belfast
1985 establishments in Northern Ireland
2014 disestablishments in Northern Ireland